Disembolus is a genus of North American dwarf spiders that was first described by Ralph Vary Chamberlin & Vaine Wilton Ivie in 1933.

Species
 it contains twenty-four species:
Disembolus alpha (Chamberlin, 1949) – USA
Disembolus amoenus Millidge, 1981 – USA
Disembolus anguineus Millidge, 1981 – USA
Disembolus bairdi Edwards, 1999 – USA
Disembolus beta Millidge, 1981 – USA
Disembolus concinnus Millidge, 1981 – USA
Disembolus convolutus Millidge, 1981 – USA
Disembolus corneliae (Chamberlin & Ivie, 1944) – Canada, USA
Disembolus galeatus Millidge, 1981 – USA
Disembolus hyalinus Millidge, 1981 – Canada
Disembolus implexus Millidge, 1981 – USA
Disembolus implicatus Millidge, 1981 – USA
Disembolus kesimbus (Chamberlin, 1949) – USA
Disembolus lacteus Millidge, 1981 – USA
Disembolus lacunatus Millidge, 1981 – USA
Disembolus phanus (Chamberlin, 1949) – USA
Disembolus procerus Millidge, 1981 – USA
Disembolus sacerdotalis (Crosby & Bishop, 1933) – USA, Canada
Disembolus sinuosus Millidge, 1981 – USA
Disembolus solanus Millidge, 1981 – USA
Disembolus stridulans Chamberlin & Ivie, 1933 (type) – USA
Disembolus torquatus Millidge, 1981 – USA
Disembolus vicinus Millidge, 1981 – USA
Disembolus zygethus Chamberlin, 1949 – USA

See also
 List of Linyphiidae species (A–H)

References

Araneomorphae genera
Linyphiidae
Spiders of North America